Aquacidia is a genus of lichen-forming fungi in the family Pilocarpaceae. It has three species, which occur in Europe and North America. The genus was circumscribed in 2018 by André Aptroot to contain a small group of Bacidia species that formed a distinct lineage in the Pilocarpaceae. The type species is Aquacidia trachona, a lichen that was originally described in 1803 by Erik Acharius as Verrucaria trachona. The genus name Aquacidia refers to the habitat of the species, which is typically on rocks near water. Lichens in this genus can form thalli that cover vast areas of substrate. For example, in Holland, the lichens can form large colonies in sheltered rock crevices between boulders in dikes.

Species
Aquacidia antricola 
Aquacidia trachona 
Aquacidia viridifarinosa

References

Pilocarpaceae
Lichen genera
Lecanorales genera
Taxa described in 2018
Taxa named by André Aptroot